One O'Clock Jump is a 1957 album by the Count Basie Orchestra, arranged by Ernie Wilkins and featuring vocalist Joe Williams on seven of the ten tracks.

Ella Fitzgerald is featured in duet with Williams on the first track, "Too Close for Comfort", arranged by Edgar Sampson. "One O'Clock Jump", "Jamboree" and "From Coast to Coast" are instrumentals by the Count Basie Orchestra.

The 1999 reissue included two additional versions of "One O'Clock Jump" as well as an alternate take of "Too Close for Comfort" sung by Williams without Fitzgerald.

Reception

Bruce Eder, writing on AllMusic said the album compared unfavorably to Basie and Williams' previous records April In Paris, and The Greatest!! Count Basie Plays, Joe Williams Sings Standards, but praised "From Coast to Coast" and "One O'Clock Jump", and Williams' performance on "Stop, Pretty Baby, Stop".

Track listing
 "Too Close for Comfort" (Jerry Bock, Larry Holofcener, George David Weiss)  – 3:02
 "Smack Dab in the Middle" (Chuck Calhoun)  – 3:36
 "Amazing Love" (Jeannie Burns)  – 3:28
 "Only Forever" (Johnny Burke, James V. Monaco)  – 3:34
 "Don't Worry 'Bout Me" (Rube Bloom, Ted Koehler)  – 3:01
 "Stop, Pretty Baby" (Milton Lovett, Red Saunders, Leon Washington)  – 3:04
 "One O'Clock Jump" (Count Basie)  – 4:29
 "Jamboree" (Ernie Wilkins)  – 4:56
 "I Don't Like You No More" (Cirino Colacrai, Teddy Randazzo)  – 2:37
 "From Coast to Coast" (Wilkins)  – 8:31
Bonus Tracks; Issued on the Verve 1999 CD re-issue, Verve 559 806-2
"Too Close for Comfort" (without Ella Fitzgerald) – 3:26
"One O'Clock Jump" (alternative take) – 2:03
"One O'Clock Jump" (alternative take) – 4:34

Personnel 
Joe Williams - vocals (tracks 1, 2, 3, 4, 5, 6, 9 & 11)
Ella Fitzgerald - vocals (track 1)
Ernie Wilkins, Edgar Sampson - arranger
 The Count Basie Orchestra:
 Count Basie - piano
 Henry Coker, Benny Powell, Bill Hughes - trombone
 Wendell Culley, Reunald Jones, Thad Jones, Joe Newman  - trumpet
 Frank Foster - tenor saxophone
 Charlie Fowlkes - baritone saxophone
 Bill Graham - alto saxophone
 Marshal Royal - clarinet, alto saxophone
 Frank Wess - flute, tenor saxophone
 Freddie Green - guitar
 Eddie Jones - double Bass
 Sonny Payne - drums
Production
Sung Lee - artwork (series art directed and designed by)
Suzanne White - design (coordinated by)
Nat Hentoff - original liner notes
Hakim Bhasdachik - mastering
Herman Leonard - cover photographs
Tom Greenwood - reissue production coordination
Carlos Kase - reissue production coordination assistance
Ben Young - restoration research technician 
Bryan Koniarz - reissue supervision

References

1957 albums
Albums produced by Norman Granz
Albums arranged by Ernie Wilkins
Count Basie Orchestra albums
Ella Fitzgerald albums
Joe Williams (jazz singer) albums
Verve Records albums